Route 25 is a city route in the Canadian city of Winnipeg, Manitoba.  It follows Inkster Boulevard from Route 90 (Brookside Boulevard) to Route 180 (McPhillips Street).  West of Route 90, Inkster Boulevard becomes PTH 190 (CentrePort Canada Way) as it leaves Winnipeg and enters the Rural Municipality of Rosser.  East of McPhillips, Inkster continues to Route 52 (Main Street), but this is not part of Route 25.

The route is a major road running through residential and industrial areas.

Major intersections

References

025